An ante up is a call in card games for a player or players to put their antes into the pot.

Ante Up may also refer to:

 "Ante Up" (song), a 2000 song by M.O.P.
 Ante Up (film), a 1974 Italian film
 "Ante Up", a song from Funkmaster Flex's The Mix Tape, Vol. IV, 2000
 "Ante Up", a song from Give Blood (Bane album), 2001
 "Ante Up", a song from Killing the Dream's album In Place Apart 2005
 Ante Up, a 2009 album by Scott Sharrard
 Ante Up, a first volume of the comic book, The Losers (Vertigo)
 Ante Up for Africa, charity poker tournament Non-bracelet events at the WSOP